Alfred John Church (29 January 1829 – 27 April 1912) was an English classical scholar.

Church was born in London and was educated at King's College, London, and Lincoln College, Oxford. He took holy orders and was an assistant-master at Merchant Taylors' School from 1857-70.  He subsequently served as headmaster of Henley-on-Thames Royal Grammar School from 1870–73, and then of King Edward VI School, Retford from 1873-80. From 1880 until 1888 he was professor of Latin at University College, London.

While at University College in partnership with William Jackson Brodribb, he translated Tacitus and edited Pliny's Letters (Epistulae). Church also wrote a number of stories in English re-telling of classical tales and legends for young people (Stories from Virgil, Stories from Homer, etc.). He also wrote much Latin and English verse, and in 1908 published his Memories of Men and Books. Church died in Richmond, Surrey.

Publications
 Stories from the Bible (1890)
 The Bible Examiner: Containing Various Prophetic Expositions
 Select Letters of Pliny the Younger. (1871); translated and edited by A. J. Church and W. J. Brodribb
 Stories from Virgil. (1879)
 Stories of the East from Herodotus. (1881) 
 Callias. (1891)
 Lords of the World. (1897)
 Roman life in the days of Cicero. (1883)
 Stories from Livy. (1883)
 Stories from the Greek Tragedians. (1880)
 The Count of the Saxon Shore. (1887)
 The Hammer. (1890)
 The burning of Rome: or, a story of the days of Nero. (1891)
 The life of Cnaeus Julius Agricola by Tacitus, Translated by Alfred John Church and William Jackson Brodribb
  (1895)
 The Story of the Odyssey. (1892)
 The Story of the Persian War. (1881)
 The Laureate's Country (1891) - with illustrations from drawings by Edward Hull.
 Stories from Ancient History (1907) - with illustrations by H. R. Millar.
 The Faery Queen and Her Knights (1909)

Notes

References

External links

 
 
 

1829 births
1912 deaths
Alumni of King's College London
Alumni of Lincoln College, Oxford
English classical scholars
Schoolteachers from Oxfordshire
Academics of University College London
Classical scholars of the University of London
Schoolteachers from Nottinghamshire
Heads of schools in England